Point Fortin, officially the Republic Borough of Point Fortin, the smallest Borough in Trinidad and Tobago is located in southwestern Trinidad, about  southwest of San Fernando, in the historic county of Saint Patrick. After the discovery of petroleum in the area in 1906 the town grew into a major oil-producing centre. The town grew with the oil industry between the 1940s and 1980s, culminating in its elevation to borough status in 1980. After the end of the oil boom Point Fortin was hit hard by economic recession in the 1980s and the closure of its oil refinery. Construction of a Liquefied Natural Gas plant by Atlantic LNG in late 1990s boosted the economy.

History and development
At the beginning of the 20th century (before the discovery of oil), Point Fortin was an agricultural community with three distinct and separately owned cocoa and coconut estates.

These estates were sparsely populated. Employment was provided for a small number of workers who depended on the estates for their living accommodation as well as their food and other supplies. Travel in and out of Point Fortin was by coastal steamers as there was no road into or out of the area. The inhabited area was located along the seacoast.

In 1907, the Trinidad Oilfields moved into Point Fortin on an expedition for the exploration of oil and sank its first oil well on the La Fortunee Estates. That company turned out to be the only one that survived successfully, although there had been several similar expeditions by other oil companies.

The company later changed its name to the United British Oilfields of Trinidad then became Shell Trinidad Limited. In 1974 it was acquired by the Government and named TRINTOC or the Trinidad and Tobago Oil Company, today known as Petrotrin.

The change from an agricultural to an oil based economy made a significant impact in Point Fortin. There was rapid development in the construction of dwelling houses, plant, pipelines and oil tanks in the area. Point Fortin was booming and labour, particularly skilled labour for the new technology, was scarce and posed a major problem. Trinidadians did not seem to be attracted to the area.

Although people migrated from all over the country, the population in 1931 was less than 500. There were very few houses, no schools, and recreational and other facilities. As a result, Trinidadians who went to work in Point Fortin never took their families with them.

However, this changed when the company realised that in order to attract and retain workers, they needed to develop the area. This encouraged families to settle in the area, and coupled with a growth in the commercial sector, brought about such facilities as a post office, police station as well as other governmental agencies and banks.

In the 1960s the town began to see a decline due to massive retrenchment. The Government tried to revive the economic activity and eventually succeeded in establishing the Dunlop Tyre Factory. However the economic revival was only achieved in the early 1970s as a result of the Oil boom and the acquisition of Shell Trinidad Limited by the government. Point Fortin's Mayor is Saleema McCree Thomas (PNM). The MP for Point Fortin is Kennedy Richards Jr. (PNM).

Demographics

Ancestry

Notable natives

Culture

Fay-Ann Lyons Alvarez – Soca Artiste 
Austin Lyons (Superblue) – Calypsonian / Soca artist/ father of Fay-Ann Lyons Alvarez and her sister Terri Lyons
Kelvin Pope (The Mighty Duke) – Calypsonian
Keegan Taylor Soca artist/Stick Fighter
Lady Tiny- Calypsonian
Iwer George - Calypsonian/ Soca artist
Naya George - Soca artiste

Sports
Atiba Charles
Avery John
Kenwyne Jones
Keyeno Thomas
Warren Archibald
Steve David
Anthony Douglas
Randy Samuel - Canadian footballer

Public service

Lionel Blake – first mayor
Victor Chin Kit – past mayor
Cyril Rogers – longest-serving MP
John Cupid – cultural researcher
Francis Bertrand – longest-serving mayor (Boro Day Pioneer)

Others
Arthur Joseph - Deal or No Deal (US game show) winner
Manchand Teeluck - professional wrestler Ring of Honor and New Japan Pro-Wrestling
Kailash Seemegona - color commentator Ring of Honor and New Japan Pro-Wrestling
Keston Jones - special effects assistant (Ash vs Evil Dead)
Blake Ramires - radio co-host pirate radio podcast (US Internet radio/podcast show)
Phillip Mitchell - radio host Univ of Hartford. CT.USA (West Indian Rhythms)WWUH
Lance Knight - Video Game Developer/Programmer and Program Development Coordinator for Waseda University Waseda University

Education
Primary schools

 Point Fortin Roman Catholic Primary School
 Point Fortin S.D.A Primary School
 Egypt Village Government Primary School
 Point Fortin Anglican Primary School
 Point Fortin A.S.J.A Primary School
 Cap-de-Ville Government Primary School
  Fanny Village Government Primary School
Secondary schools
 Point Fortin East Secondary School (formally known as PFC)
 Point Fortin West Secondary School (formally known as the Junior Secondary)
 Holy Name Convent'

Other Educational/Training Institutions
 Manchand Teeluck's Squared Circle Grappling Academy - Professional Wrestling Academy
 Lu-Wong Dance Academy
 Com Sa Choi - Asian Culinary Institute
 Club Malibu - Pole Dancing Academy

Electoral districts
 Egypt Village
 Techier/Guapo Village
 Mahaica/New Lands Village 
 Cap-De-Ville/Fanny Village
 New Village
 Hollywood Village

References

 
Populated places in Trinidad and Tobago
Ports and harbours of Trinidad and Tobago
Municipalities of Trinidad and Tobago
Populated coastal places in Trinidad and Tobago